Cheppra  is a small town in kottarakara taluk under Veliyam Grama Panchayath. The Nearest towns are Ummanoor and Odanavattom. It is well Connected with Roads.

Transportation
Chempra village connects to other parts of India through Vatakara town on the west and Kuttiady town on the east.  National highway No.66 passes through Vatakara and the northern stretch connects to Mangalore, Goa and Mumbai.  The southern stretch connects to Cochin and Trivandrum.  The eastern National Highway No.54 going through Kuttiady connects to Mananthavady, Mysore and Bangalore. The nearest airports are at Kannur and Kozhikode.  The nearest railway station is at Vatakara.

References

Kuttiady area